Cychropsis paramontana is a species of black coloured ground beetle in the subfamily of Carabinae. It was described by Sehnal & Hackel in 2006 and is endemic to China.

References

paramontana
Beetles described in 2006
Endemic fauna of China